Lake Solano is a reservoir formed by Putah Diversion Dam impounding Putah Creek, located in the Vaca Mountains within Yolo County and northern Solano County, California. 

The California Office of Environmental Health Hazard Assessment has issued a safe eating advisory for any fish caught in Putah Creak including Lake Solano due to elevated levels of mercury.

Geography
It serves to divert water into the Putah South Canal to supply agricultural and urban users.

Recreation
The lake and the surrounding land is used for recreation as Lake Solano County Park, with public campgrounds and the Lake Solano Nature Center. Activities include picnicking, camping, boating, swimming, fishing, bird watching, and hiking.

References

External links
  Solano County.ca.gov: Lake Solano County Park and Campground

Solano
Solano
Parks in Solano County, California
Protected areas of Yolo County, California
Vaca Mountains
Winters, California
Campgrounds in California